Gogana kerara is a moth in the family Drepanidae first described by Swinhoe in 1902. It is found on Borneo and Peninsular Malaysia.

The ground colour is uniform ochreous grey, the wings with a minute blackish dot at the end of each cell, the forewings with a rather broad brownish median band, a discal line of blackish lunules. The space to the outer margin is brownish, containing a pale sinuous submarginal line. The hindwings have a faintly indicated discal line of blackish lunules. The space beyond is brown with a subterminal pale sinuous line as on the forewings.

The larvae feed on Daemonorops grandis and Orania silvicola.

References

Moths described in 1902
Drepaninae